August Högn (2 August 187813 December 1961) was a German teacher, composer and historian.

Biography 
August Högn was born on 2 August 1878, the middle of five children to married bookbinders Andreas and Helene Högn in Deggendorf. Like all children of the later municipality authorities, county commissioners and legislative representatives, Andreas taught August piano. He continued his studies and trained to teach at the prep school in Deggendorf (1891–1894) and at the teaching school in Straubing (1894–1896). As a young teacher he was placed in many locations (Deggendorf, Neukirchen (Niederbayern),Schaufling, Geratskirchen, Zeilarn, Wallersdorf, Eberhardsreuth).

On 20 June 1904 Högn married Emme Gerstl in Wallersdorf. From this marriage came two children (Elfriede, 14 August 1906; August, 17 January 1912). Högn was sent to Ruhmannsfelden, where he remained until his death. In his first years there he made a name for himself as dean of the gymnastics club (21 May 1910 – 27 December 1913), secretary of the Ruhmannsfelden volunteer fire dept. (26 December 1910 – 26 December 1950), and parish clerk for the neighboring Zachenberg (1913–1920). Högn's wife Emma died 26 June 1926. Following this Högn hired his housekeeper Rosa Beischmied, who lived and worked with him until his death.

In the Third Reich Högn was bound to political events as "community section leader," "subgroup leader," and commissioner for "Protector of Common Property". (Volksgut meaning the national cultural treasures that are poetry, stories, music etc..) 
Högn supposedly maintained good relations with his son-in-law, Karl Schlumprecht, who was the mayor of the city of Bayreuth and a member of the National-Socialist party. One should not underestimate the influence this relationship may have had on his political views during the time of Third Reich.

Högn was suspended in 1945 as a result of the nazification of teaching. He held various positions of headmaster at the school since 1921. After a short teaching stint in 1947 he retired. Högn suffered from a stroke in 1953 and was partially paralyzed. He died on 13 December 1961 in Ruhmannsfelden and was buried on 15 December in Deggendorf.

From 1926-1929 newspaper articles from Högn on local history were published. In his retirement he published three large essays regarding local history, (“History of Ruhmannsfelden” 1949,  “History and Chronicles of the Ruhmannsfelden Volunteer Fire Department” 1951, and “Local History of the Zachenberg Community” 1953.)

In 1919 Högn engaged himself as singing and orchestral director of the Ruhmannsfelden gymnastics club. The musical comedy “The Holledauer Fidel” from Erhard Kutschenreuter was performed under his direction, being the largest and most successful offering of the gymnastics club.

From the ages of 20 to 76, Högn was active as singer, organist and choir leader of multiple church choirs in the Passau and Regensburg dioceses. In Ruhmannsfelden he operated most notably for 43 years as organist and in three phases as choir leader (1921–24, 1927–29, and 1940–53). His numerous religious works, including three Mass songs and thirteen Marienlieder predominantly originate from his time as choir director in Ruhmannsfelden. His first composition (Veni creator spiritus B-Dur) originates from 1898, and his final in 1960 (Marienlied Nr.13 Es-Dur). In 1905 his march In Treue fest was published.

Works

Compositions

Religious music 
Masses
 "Laurentius"-Messe C-Dur op. 14 (4-st. gem. Chor, Blechbläserquartett, Orgel) (Neuausgabe)
 "Mater-Dei"-Messe F-Dur op. 16 (4-st. gem. Chor, Streichquintett, Orgel) (Neuausgabe)
 "Josephi"-Messe F-Dur op. 62 (4-st. gem. Chor, Soli, 2 Vl., Blechbläserquartett, Orgel)

Tantum ergo
 Tantum ergo Nr. 1 Es-Dur op. 11 (4-st. gem. Chor, Streichquintett, Orgel) (Neuausgabe)
 Tantum ergo Nr. 2 F-Dur op. 32 (4-st. gem. Chor, Streichquintett, Orgel) (Neuausgabe)
 Tantum ergo Nr. 3 Es-Dur op. 49 (4-st. gem. Chor, Streichquintett, Orgel)
 Tantum ergo Nr. 4 A-Dur op. 49 (4-st. gem. Chor, Streichquintett, Orgel)

Pange lingua
 Pange lingua G-Dur (deutsch) (4-st. gem. Chor, Blechbläserquartett)
 Pange lingua F-Dur op. 43 (4-st. gem. Chor, Orgel)
 Pange lingua Es-Dur op. 46 (4-st. gem. Chor, Orgel)
 Pange lingua Es-Dur op. 51 (4-st. gem. Chor, Orgel)

Marienlieder
 Ave Maria F-Dur op. 4 (Unter- und Oberstimme, Orgel)
 Marienlied Nr. 1 F-Dur op. 13 a (4-st. gem. Chor, Orgel)
 Marienlied Nr. 2 e-moll op. 19 (Sopran-Solo, 4-st. gem. Chor, Orgel)
 Marienlied Nr. 3 F-Dur op. 22 (Sopran-Solo, 4-st. gem. Chor, Orgel) (Neuausgabe)
 Marienlied Nr. 4 G-Dur op. 23 (Sopran-Solo, 4-st. gem. Chor, Orgel)
 Marienlied Nr. 5 F-Dur op. 28 (4-st. gem. Chor, Orgel)
 Marienlied Nr. 6 F-Dur op. 41 (4-st. Frauenchor, Orgel) (Neuausgabe)
 Marienlied Nr. 7 G-Dur op. 45 ((fragmentarisch) Sopran-Solo, 4-st. gem. Chor, Orgel)
 Marienlied Nr. 8 G-Dur op. 54 (Sopran-Solo, 4-st. gem. Chor, Orgel)
 Marienlied Nr. 9 G-Dur op. 34 (4-st. Männerchor)
 Marienlied Nr. 10 F-Dur op. 56 (2 Sopran- und Alt-Solo, 4-st. gem. Chor, Orgel)
 Marienlied Nr. 11 F-Dur op. 59 (Bariton-Solo, 4-st. gem. Chor, Orgel) (Neuausgabe)
 Marienlied Nr. 12 F-Dur op. 63 (Sopran- und Alt-Solo, Orgel)
 Marienlied (Nr. 13) C-Dur (Sopran-Solo, Klavier o. Harmonium) (Neuausgabe)

Grablieder
 Grablied für gefallene Soldaten Es-Dur op. 35 (4-st. gem. Chor, Blechbläserquartett)
 Grablied Nr. 1 Es-Dur op. 35 (4-st. gem. Chor, Blechbläserquartett) (Neuausgabe)
 Grablied Nr. 2 Es-Dur (4-st. gem. Chor, Blechbläserquartett) (Neuausgabe)
 Grablied Nr. 3 Es-Dur op. 44 (4-st. gem. Chor, Blechbläserquartett) (Neuausgabe)
 Grablied Nr. 4 F-Dur op. 20 (Sopran-Solo, 4-st. gem. Chor, Orgel) (Neuausgabe)

Offertorien
 Offertorium D-Dur op. 26 (4-st. gem. Chor, Orgel)
 Offertorium C-Dur op. 30 (4-st. gem. Chor, Orgel) (Neuausgabe)
 Offertorium G-Dur op. 48 (4-st. Männerchor, Orgel) (Neuausgabe)

Kommunionlieder
 Kommunionlied Es-Dur op. 12 (4-st. gem. Chor, Orgel)
 Kommunionlied G-Dur op. 21 a (4-st. gem. Chor, Orgel)
 Kommunionlied G-Dur op. 21 b (4-st. gem. Chor, Orgel)
 Kommunionlied C-Dur op. 37 b (4-st. gem. Chor, Orgel)

Veni creator Spiritius
 Veni creator Spiritus B-Dur (4-st. Männerchor) (Neuausgabe)
 11 Veni creator Spiritus op. 15
 Veni creator Spiritus C-Dur Nr. 1 (4-st. gem. Chor)
 Veni creator Spiritus D-Dur Nr. 2 (4-st. gem. Chor)
 Veni creator Spiritus Es-Dur Nr. 3 (4-st. gem. Chor)
 Veni creator Spiritus E-Dur Nr. 4 (4-st. gem. Chor)
 Veni creator Spiritus F-Dur Nr. 5 (4-st. gem. Chor)
 Veni creator Spiritus Fis-Dur Nr. 6 (4-st. gem. Chor)
 Veni creator Spiritus G-Dur Nr. 7 (4-st. gem. Chor)
 Veni creator Spiritus As-Dur Nr. 8 (4-st. gem. Chor)
 Veni creator Spiritus A-Dur Nr. 9 (4-st. gem. Chor)
 Veni creator Spiritus B-Dur Nr. 10 (4-st. gem. Chor)
 Veni creator Spiritus H-Dur Nr. 11 (4-st. gem. Chor)

Adjuva nos
 Adjuva nos Es-Dur op. 8 (4-st. gem. Chor, Streichquintett, Orgel)
 8 Adjuva nos op. 15
 Adjuva nos C-Dur Nr. 1 (4-st. gem. Chor)
 Adjuva nos D-Dur Nr. 2 (4-st. gem. Chor)
 Adjuva nos Es-Dur Nr. 3 (4-st. gem. Chor)
 Adjuva nos E-Dur Nr. 4 (4-st. gem. Chor)
 Adjuva nos F-Dur Nr. 5 (4-st. gem. Chor)
 Adjuva nos G-Dur Nr. 6 (4-st. gem. Chor)
 Adjuva nos A-Dur Nr. 7 (4-st. gem. Chor)
 Adjuva nos B-Dur Nr. 8 (4-st. gem. Chor)

Various genres
 Cäcilienlied E-Dur op. 12 b (3-st. Frauenchor, Orgel) (Neuausgabe)
 Libera e-moll op. 50 4-st. gem. Chor) (Neuausgabe)
 Benedictus G-Dur op. 50 (4-st. gem. Chor)
 Fronleichnams-Prozessionsgesänge Es-Dur op. 52 (4-st. gem. Chor, Blechbläserquartett)
 Ecce sacerdos F-Dur op. 57 (4-st. gem. Chor, Blechbläserquartett, Orgel)
 Juravit Dominus B-Dur op. 58 (4-st. gem. Chor, Blechbläserquartett, Orgel)
 "Ehre sei Gott" C-Dur (4-st. gem. Chor)
 Herz-Jesu-Litanei (verloren)

Secular music 
 Marsch "In Treue fest!" D-Dur   (Klavier) (Neuausgabe)
 Weihegesang Es-Dur (fragmentarisch)   (4-st. gem. Chor, Blechbläserquartett)
 Lied von Gotteszell G-Dur op. 42 (Arrangement)   (4-st. Männerchor)

Historical works 
 Geschichte von Ruhmannsfelden (Ausgabe 2003)
 Geschichte von Zachenberg (August Högn / Anton Trellinger) (Ausgabe 2003)
 Geschichte der Freiwilligen Feuerwehr Ruhmannsfelden (Ausgabe 2003)
 heimatkundliche Zeitungsartikel: (Ausgabe 2003)
"Durch Gäu und Wald", Beilage zum Deggendorfer Donauboten, 6. November 1926 - "Geschichtliches vom Markt Ruhmannsfelden: Der Name "Ruhmannsfelden"; Die Bezeichnung "Markt""
"Durch Gäu und Wald", Beilage zum Deggendorfer Donauboten, 15. Dezember 1926 - "Geschichtliches vom Markt Ruhmannsfelden: Das Wappen von Ruhmannsfelden; Schloss und Schlossberg Ruhmannsfelden"
"Durch Gäu und Wald", Beilage zum Deggendorfer Donauboten, 20. August 1927 - "Geschichtliches vom Markt Ruhmannsfelden: Von der Schule in Ruhmannsfelden in früherer Zeit bis 1835"
"Geschichtliches vom Markt Ruhmannsfelden: Von der Schule in Ruhmannsfelden ab 1835" (Quelle aus der Chronik der Volksschule Ruhmannsfelden, vermutlich Abschrift eines Zeitungsartikels von Högn)
"Durch Gäu und Wald", Beilage zum Deggendorfer Donauboten, Nr. 23 / 1927 "Das Wallfahrtskirchlein Osterbrünnl bei Ruhmannsfelden"
"Durch Gäu und Wald", Beilage zum Deggendorfer Donauboten, Nr. 2 / 1928 - "Das Wallfahrtskirchlein Osterbrünnlein bei Ruhmannsfelden"
 Viechtacher Tagblatt, 9. September 1928 - "Was Ruhmannsfelden für Jubiläen feiern könnte?"
 Viechtacher Tagblatt, 25. Oktober 1928 - "Wie hat es um Ruhmannsfelden herum ausgesehen vor seiner Entstehung?"
 Viechtacher Tagblatt, 1928/29 - "Pfarrkirche St. Laurentius Ruhmannsfelden" (in drei Artikeln erschienen)

Recordings 
Josephi-Messe F-Dur op. 62 (Kirchenchor Ruhmannsfelden, Kirchenchor Gotteszell, Leitung: Josef Friedrich)

Laurentius-Messe C-Dur op. 14 (Kirchenchor Ruhmannsfelden, Brassoholics (Leitung: Andreas Stich), Gesamtleitung: August Lankes

selected works

Interviews with coevals 
 Interview with Wilhelm Ederer, Aug. 2002

 
 
 
 
 
 
 
 
 
 
 
 
 
 
 
 
 
 
 
 
 

 Interview mit Lilo Leuze, 14.1.2005

Literature 

 Josef Friedrich: Der Mozart von Ruhmannsfelden - Leben und Werk des Schulrektors, Heimatforschers und Komponisten August Högn (1878 - 1961). Verlag Karl Stutz, Passau 2007, 
 Josef Friedrich: "Der Mozart von Ruhmannsfelden!" - Leben und Werk des Ruhmannsfeldener Schulrektors, Heimatforschers und Komponisten August Högn (1878 - 1961), Zulassungsarbeit zur ersten Staatsprüfung für das Lehramt an Gymnasien, eingereicht bei Prof. Dr. Siegfried Mauser im Fach historische Musikwissenschaft, Ruhmannsfelden, München, April 2005

External links 

 Website about life and works of August Högn
 all compositions of August Högn on IMSLP

1878 births
1961 deaths
German composers
20th-century German historians
Heads of schools in Germany
German conductors (music)
German male conductors (music)
People from Deggendorf
People from Regen (district)
German male non-fiction writers